Petru Pascari (born 22 September 1929) is a Soviet and Moldovan politician.

Biography 
Petru Pascari was born in the small village of Stroenți (Stroiești) in the north of Transnistria, in Rîbnița District.

Petru Pascari was on two occasions the prime minister of the Moldavian SSR: 24 April 1970 – 1 August 1976 (1st time) and 10 January – 26 May 1990 (2nd time).

References

 

1929 births
Living people
People from Rîbnița District
Central Committee of the Communist Party of the Soviet Union candidate members
Sixth convocation members of the Soviet of Nationalities
Eighth convocation members of the Soviet of Nationalities
Ninth convocation members of the Soviet of Nationalities
Tenth convocation members of the Soviet of Nationalities
Eleventh convocation members of the Soviet of Nationalities
Communist Party of Moldavia politicians
Heads of government of the Moldavian Soviet Socialist Republic
People's commissars and ministers of the Moldavian Soviet Socialist Republic
Moldovan economists
Recipients of the Order of Lenin